Mycoleptodiscus terrestris is a fungal plant pathogen.

Host and symptoms
Mycoleptodiscus terrestris is an ascomycete with a wide host range that includes several types of popular aquatic weeds that have become invasive in their problem states – mainly southern states. But aside from them the pathogen also infects several types of alfalfa and legumes and have been seen to infect plants all the way up to Minnesota. This disease is known to cause several symptoms in affected hosts including: leaf spot, crowning, and lots of root rot. These symptoms are what cause major yield loss and is why this pathogen is so important to our agricultural systems.

Importance
This pathogen affects a large amount of very important crops from our legume families to the less important crops in other countries that don't support the economy. In America the crops of interest are the legumes and alfalfa we grow, but in other countries like Asia and Australia it affects a wider range like some Lotuses, Psium, and fabaceae just to name a few. What is truly important about this pathogen is that it has been studied since the 1970s in order for it to be used as a viable control of aquatic weeds like watermilfoil that is invasive in warmer wet regions of America. What has been found is that it can and will infect these pest plants and could be used as a viable control since they cause plant killing symptoms in target plants after being treated with just some hyphae and fungal material in the water.

Disease cycle
The disease cycle of Mycoleptodiscus terrestris is very dependent on it being able to spread its sclerotia. This pathogen mainly overwinters in these strong structures which then begin to affect the next year's crop in the form of damping off or late germination infection which targets the roots and stem first of the young plants. In fact the sclerotia of this pathogen are so highly developed and sturdy that they are collected as the inoculum in many experiments involving the pathogen and they are often viable through several different conditions including different levels of moisture and temperature. They can often be collected and dried chemically and they will still be viable for inoculation or study.

See also
 List of soybean diseases

References

Magnaporthales
Fungal plant pathogens and diseases
Fungi described in 1953
Soybean diseases